MKM steel, an alloy containing nickel and aluminum, was developed in 1931 by metallurgist Tokushichi Mishima (三島徳七). While conducting research into the properties of nickel, Mishima discovered that a strongly magnetic steel could be created by adding aluminum to non-magnetic nickel steel.

Characteristics
The developers claim MKM steel is tough and durable, inexpensive to produce, maintains strong magnetism when miniaturized and can produce a stable magnetic force in spite of temperature changes or vibration.  MKM steel is similar to Alnico.

Acronym
MKM is an acronym for Mishima Kizumi Magnetic, 'Kizumi (喜住)' being the inventor's childhood surname.

References

Steels
Magnetic alloys
Ferromagnetic materials
1931 introductions
Aluminium alloys
Japanese inventions